Canfield's Diet Chocolate Fudge soda is a zero-calorie, aspartame-sweetened carbonated soft drink canned and distributed by the A.J. Canfield Company of Elgin, Illinois, USA, a division of Select Beverages. Production for the midwestern United States is handled by the American Bottling Company, a subsidiary of Keurig Dr Pepper and distribution by Kehe Foods of Chicago.

History

Beginnings
The beverage was introduced in 1972 by 32-year-old Alan B. Canfield, senior vice president of Elgin, Illinois-based A.J. Canfield Beverages, a company founded by his grandfather.  Canfield was a regular dieter and chocolate lover, and got the idea the year before and brought a two-pound box of fudge to Manny Wesber, the company's chief chemist.

Wesber succeeded in creating a saccharin-sweetened chemically-created concoction, entirely artificially flavored. The drink sold moderately well among Canfield's other brands, with sales remaining steady over the next 13 years.

1984 reintroduction
Canfield's Diet Chocolate Fudge was, by this time, sweetened with aspartame. When Chicago Tribune reporter Bob Greene reviewed the product and described it as tasting "like a calorie-free hot fudge sundae," sales went from lukewarm to highly successful in the soft drink market practically overnight.

By 1985, regional bottlers across the United States were seeking franchise rights.  With these rights in place, more than 200 million cans of Canfield's Diet Chocolate Fudge soda were sold in 1985. As competition from other makers increased, Canfield's grew increasingly protective of their "Chocolate Fudge" moniker, going so far as to sue rival maker Vess Beverages over their use of the name, "Vess Diet Chocolate Fudge."  A federal district court judge ruled in favor of Canfield and issued a preliminary injunction disallowing the use of the word "fudge" on their packaging.  Though the injunction was later overturned, the case, known as Canfield v. Honickman, continues to be used as an example during the study of trademark product law.

Spinoffs proved less successful.  1987 saw the introduction of "Diet Cherry Chocolate Fudge" and "Diet Peanut Chocolate Fudge," both of which are still sold today in limited numbers.

Sale of brand
In 1995, the A.J. Canfield Company was sold to Select Beverages for an undisclosed sum.  The company's plant in Elgin, which had been operating since the 1930s, closed the following year.  Production of the Diet Chocolate Fudge drinks was moved to another plant.

See also
 Diet food
 List of chocolate drinks

Notes

References

Diet drinks
 Chocolate drinks
Keurig Dr Pepper brands
Products introduced in 1972
Products introduced in 1984